Pterostylis arenicola, commonly known as the sandhill rustyhood is a plant in the orchid family Orchidaceae and is endemic to South Australia. It has a rosette of leaves near its base and up to ten reddish-brown and white flowers with a dark brown, insect-like labellum. Its distribution is now restricted to areas around Lake Alexandrina.

Description
Pterostylis arenicola is a terrestrial,  perennial, deciduous, herb with an underground tuber and which only occurs as solitary plants. It has a rosette of between eight and twelve leaves at the base of the flowering spike. Flowering occurs from August to October.

Taxonomy and naming
Pterostylis arenicola was first formally described in 1989 by Mark Clements and Joyce Stewart from a specimen collected south of Tailem Bend and the description was published in Australian Orchid Research. The specific epithet (arenicola) is derived from the Latin words arena meaning "sand" and -cola meaning "dweller".

Distribution and habitat
The sandhill rustyhood is only known from populations at Grange and West Lakes in the Adelaide metropolitan area, “between Tailem Bend and Wellington” and an area “south-east of Langhorne Creek and near the lower Murray and Murray Lakes.”  It is locally common in sandy soil on coloured sand dunes in mallee and Callitris woodland with an understorey of shrub, heath, sedge and grass.

There are records from Victoria but they may not be of this species.

Ecology
Success has been achieved in germinating seeds of P. arenicola in vitro by inoculating them with a mychorrizal fungus.

Conservation
Pterostylis arenicola is listed as "vulnerable" under the Australian Government Environment Protection and Biodiversity Conservation Act 1999 and the South Australian National Parks and Wildlife Act 1972. The main threats to the species are weed invasion, grazing and soil disturbance and inappropriate fire regimes.

References

arenicola
Plants described in 1989